Siniena is a town in the Banfora Department of Comoé Province in south-western Burkina Faso. The town has a population of 3,702.

References

Populated places in the Cascades Region
Comoé Province